A red-light district is a neighborhood where prostitution is common.

Red Light District may refer to:
The Red Light District, the title of the 2004 album by rapper Ludacris
The Red Light District (theatre company), a Toronto, Ontario-based theatre collective
Red Light District Video, a pornography studio based in Los Angeles, California
Red-Light District, Montreal